Fiachra Finn, 3rd king of Uí Maine, fl. 5th-century.

John O'Donovan remarked that "Fiachra Finn, the son of Bresal (No. 2), seventeen years, when he was treacherously slain by his brother Maine Mall. Fiachra Finn is styled in the poem, ‘a tower in conflict and battle.’ He is the ancestor of the O'Naghtens and O'Mullallys or Lallys."

References

 http://www.rootsweb.ancestry.com/~irlkik/ihm/uimaine.htm
 Annals of Ulster at CELT: Corpus of Electronic Texts at University College Cork
 Annals of Tigernach at CELT: Corpus of Electronic Texts at University College Cork
 Revised edition of McCarthy's synchronisms at Trinity College Dublin.
 Irish Kings and High-Kings, Francis John Byrne, Dublin (1971; 2003) Four Courts Press, 
 History of the O'Maddens of Hy-Many, Gerard Madden, 2004. .
 The Life, Legends and Legacy of Saint Kerrill: A Fifth-Century East Galway Evangelist by Joseph Mannion, 2004. 
 The Tribes and Customs of Hy-Many, commonly called O'Kelly's Country

People from County Galway
People from County Roscommon
5th-century Irish monarchs
Kings of Uí Maine